The Council of State of the Canton of Vaud is the executive organ of the Canton of Vaud, in Switzerland.  Vaud has a seven-member Conseil d'État. The responsibilities of the Council of State is to run the administration, submit laws and decrees to the Grand Council, observe a budget and adopt regulations or directives. Essentially, the Cantons define their own structure within federal regulations. Switzerland consists of twenty-six cantons in which each can influence the federal government. Vaud is a part of these cantons, and it is the central area connected to high trafficked communication routes in Switzerland. Guy Parmelin, a former Swiss president, is from the Canton of Vaud, and was first elected into their government in 2015.

Members

Notes and references

See also 
 Grand Council of Vaud
 List of cantonal executives of Switzerland

External links
 Council of State official webpage

Politics of the canton of Vaud
Vaud